Hereford Pegasus Football Club is a football club based in Hereford, England. The club is affiliated to the Herefordshire County FA. Pegasus Juniors Football Club run a total of 23 teams and provide football for all ages, starting from the age of five.

History
The club was formed as Pegasus Juniors in 1955 by a group of players from the Herefordshire County Boys team who wished to continue playing together.  Their name was inspired by the great amateur team Pegasus.

Originally the club played in the local Herefordshire League, where they accumulated a large number of league titles and cups, until in 1982 they stepped up to the Hellenic League.  In 1985 they were Division One champions and promoted to the Premier Division.  Eight years later they were relegated but bounced back at the first attempt.  In 1995 they were relegated once again due to their ground failing new guidelines, but in 1999 they returned to the Premier Division where they remained until relegated in 2011, where they opted to join the West Midlands (Regional) League Premier Division, rather than drop into the Hellenic League Division One West to minimise travel. A season of consolidation followed before a much improved seventh place finish in 2012–13. A change of management ahead of 2013–14 led to a second place finish.

In the 2009–10 season, they reached the second qualifying round of the FA Cup when they travelled to Football Conference side AFC Telford United having defeated higher graded Willenhall Town and Hednesford Town along the way, however they were unable to progress any further losing 4–1 in front of a crowd of 1,136.

In 2019 the club changed its name to Hereford Pegasus.

Honours
Hellenic Football League Division One
Champions 1984–85, 1998–99
Runners-up 1993–94
West Midlands (Regional) League Premier Division
Runners-up 2013–14

Records
Best league performance: 5th in Hellenic League Premier Division, 1988–89
Best FA Cup performance: 2nd qualifying round, 2009–10
Best FA Vase performance: 2nd round, 2000–01 & 2014-15

References

External links
Club website

 

Football clubs in Herefordshire
Hellenic Football League
Association football clubs established in 1955
1955 establishments in England
West Midlands (Regional) League
Football clubs in England
Herefordshire Football League